Morison Global (previously Morison KSi) is a global association of professional service firms (accounting, auditing, tax and business consulting). The association has over 150 member firms in more than 80 countries. Morison Global's status as an association is in accordance with the International Federation of Accountants (IFAC) audit code and the EU Statutory Audit Directive 2006/43/(EC) (“the 8th Directive”). Morison Global is ranked by the International Accounting Bulletin as the 10th largest accounting association in the world. In January 2021, the combined revenue of all member firms was USD978m.

History

Morison Global was formed in 2016 from a merger of two successful, well-established organisations Morison International and KS International. Their common goal of providing their individual clients’ cross-border needs with superior quality service has bound the two associations together.

Both associations were established after the same ICAEW (Institute of Chartered Accountants in England and Wales) dinner in 1990 organised for French and UK accounting firms to forge links. Aplitec met Morison Stoneham who went on to form Morison International and Kingston Smith met Cabinet Sorel who went on to form KS International.

Morison International 

The association is the legacy of Walter Morison (26 November 1919 - 26 March 2009) a Royal Air Force pilot who became a prisoner of war and was sent to Colditz for attempting to steal an enemy aircraft during the Second World War.

Following the war, Morison qualified as a chartered accountant at the Institute of Chartered Accountants in England & Wales. He was articled at Morison Stoneham, a firm established by his great uncle. Morison then worked at Coopers Bros, the firm that became Coopers & Lybrand, before returning to his family firm, Morison Stoneham. He led the firm as a senior partner through a period of great change from 1960 to 1981 before retiring. Morison Stoneham was the founding firm of Morison International.

Corporate Governance
Morison Global is run under the direction of an international Board with 5 sub-regional Boards - Africa, Asia Pacific, Europe, Latin America and North America. It's CEO is Kenny Young.

See also
Accountancy
Audit
International Standards on Auditing

References

Accounting firms of the United Kingdom